Ignacio Alejandro Jeraldino Jil (born 6 December 1995) is a Chilean professional footballer who will play as a striker for Segunda División club Sporting Gijón on loan from Liga MX club Santos Laguna.

Club career
In February 2015 Jeraldino joined on loan from Unión San Felipe to Italian club Parma of the Serie A, but he failed to complete his move to Europe after the club's bankruptcy.

On 7 December 2019, Jeraldino joined to Mexican club Atlas from Audax Italiano.

In 2022, he played on loan at Coquimbo Unido.

In 2023, he moved to Spain and joined Sporting Gijón on loan.

Personal life
His twin brother Juan is also a footballer.

Due to his Italian heritage, he holds Italian passport.

References

External links
 
 Ignacio Jeraldino at playmakerstats.com (English version of ceroacero.es)
 

1995 births
Living people
People from San Felipe de Aconcagua Province
Chilean people of Italian descent
Chilean footballers
Chile international footballers
Chile under-20 international footballers
Chilean expatriate footballers
Unión San Felipe footballers
Parma Calcio 1913 players
Unión La Calera footballers
Audax Italiano footballers
Atlas F.C. footballers
Santos Laguna footballers
Coquimbo Unido footballers
Sporting de Gijón players
Chilean Primera División players
Segunda División Profesional de Chile players
Primera B de Chile players
Serie A players
Liga MX players
Segunda División players
Expatriate footballers in Italy
Chilean expatriate sportspeople in Italy
Expatriate footballers in Mexico
Chilean expatriate sportspeople in Mexico
Expatriate footballers in Spain
Chilean expatriate sportspeople in Spain
Association football forwards
Chilean twins
Twin sportspeople
People with acquired Italian citizenship